Byrsia is a genus of moths in the family Erebidae.

Species
 Byrsia amoena
 Byrsia aurantiaca
 Byrsia buruana
 Byrsia dotata

References

External links
Natural History Museum Lepidoptera generic names catalog

Lithosiini
Moth genera